The 2012 Nadeshiko League season was won by INAC Kobe Leonessa, who went undefeated the whole season and defended their 2011 title.

Nadeshiko League (Division 1)

Result

League awards

Best player

Top scorers

Best eleven

Best young player

Challenge League (Division 2)

Result

Best Player: Minako Ito, Vegalta Sendai Ladies
Top scorers: Ayaka Michigami, Tokiwagi Gakuen High School L.S.C.

Promotion/relegation series

Division 1 promotion/relegation series

F.C. Takahashi Kibi International University Charme Promoted for Division 1 in 2013 Season.
AS Elfen Sayama F.C. Relegated to Division 2 in 2014 Season.

Division 2 Promotion series

Promotion games

ShimizuDaihachi Pleiades, Cerezo Osaka Ladies, HOYO Sukarabu F.C.Promoted for Division 2 in 2013 Season.

Repechage games

Nojima Stella Kanagawa Promoted for Division 2 in 2013 Season. 
Norddea Hokkaido, NGU Nagoya F.C. Ladies play to Division 2 promotion/relegation Series.

Division 2 promotion/relegation series

AC Nagano Parceiro Ladies, Japan Soccer College Ladies stay Division 2 in 2013 Season

See also
Empress's Cup

References

External links
 Nadeshiko League Official Site
Season at soccerway.com

Nadeshiko League seasons
1
L
Japan
Japan